Oakley Neil H. T. Caesar-Su (born 4 June 1998), known professionally as Central Cee, is a British rapper and songwriter from Shepherd's Bush, London. He rose to prominence in 2020 with the release of the singles "Day in the Life" and "Loading". His first mixtape Wild West was released on 12 March 2021, which debuted at number two on the UK Albums Chart. His second mixtape 23 was released on 25 February 2022 and debuted atop the UK Albums Chart.

Early life
Oakley Neil H T Caesar-Su was born on 4 June 1998 in Ladbroke Grove, London, but relocated to Shepherd's Bush early in his life. He was raised by his mother alongside three younger brothers, one of whom is Juke Caesar, who appeared on the 23 mixtape under the name "Lil Bro". When Caesar-Su visited his father, he would be shown American hip-hop. He would also be exposed to reggae and dancehall when he attended Notting Hill Carnival. Caesar-Su has stated that he kept to himself in school, but would occasionally misbehave and lose his temper. He went to the same school as rapper Digga D, being a couple of school years higher. Caesar-Su began recording music when he was 14. He worked at a shoe store for three weeks before finding out his wage and quitting.

Career

2014–2019: Career beginnings
Ceasar-Su made his first public appearance on a now-deleted episode of Charlie Sloth's Fire In The Streets series in 2014, where he adopted the rapper name "Central Cee" (first listed as Central C). His first song appearance was on the "Ain't On Nuttin Remix" alongside J Hus, Bonkaz, and more in January 2015. He released his "StreetHeat Freestyle" in February of the same year. In February 2016, Central Cee was featured alongside Dave and others on the remix to the song "Spirit Bomb" by AJ Tracey. He later released the single "Pull Up" in August 2016. In March 2017, Central Cee made an appearance on music platform BL@CKBOX and performed verses to Tupac instrumentals alongside Drey Bambino. Central Cee released his first projects, the EP 17, and the now-deleted EPs Nostalgia and CS Vol. 1 in 2017. His "Next Up?" freestyle was released in October 2019, following a number of singles that released that year.

2020–2021: Viral success and Wild West
Central Cee met his future manager YBeeez in 2019, who encouraged him to pursue music further. After switching from auto-tuned hip hop to a style similar to UK drill, Central Cee released his breakout single "Day in the Life" on 14 June 2020. He followed it up with "Molly" in July, and achieved further success with the single "Loading", released on 22 October 2020. The music videos for the three tracks were released by GRM Daily. "Loading" and February 2021's "Commitment Issues" both reached the top 20 of the UK Singles Chart. Central Cee self-released his debut mixtape Wild West in March 2021, which debuted at number two on the UK Albums Chart and number one on the UK R&B Albums Chart.

2021–present: 23 and No More Leaks
In September 2021, the single "Obsessed with You" reached number 4 on the UK Singles Chart, which would become the lead single from his second mixtape, 23, announced in November 2021. Central Cee's Daily Duppy was released on Christmas of 2021. The second and third singles from the mixtape, "Retail Therapy" and "Cold Shoulder", were released on 6 January and 27 January 2022. On 25 February 2022, 23 was released and became his first number one on the UK Albums Chart.

Following previews at concerts and on social media, his single “Doja” released on 21 July 2022 alongside a music video directed by Cole Bennett. It became his highest charting song of his career, debuting at number 2 on the UK Singles Chart. The song also reached number 12 on the US Bubbling Under Hot 100 chart. On 14 October 2022, Central Cee surprise released his EP No More Leaks, which was supported by the single "One Up" which released the day before. On 16 December 2022, he released the single "Let Go", which samples the Passenger single "Let Her Go" and peaked at number six on the UK Singles Chart. In 2022, Central Cee became the first UK rapper to achieve 1 billion Spotify streams in a single year. On 9 February 2023, he released the single "Me & You".

Modeling 
Central Cee made his modeling debut for Drake's Nike X Nocta collection on 6 April 2021. He fronted Jaquemus' "Neve World" campaign in November 2022.

Artistry 
Beginning his career performing British hip-hop, Central Cee switched to the trapwave genre in 2016, a style of British hip hop which utilizes auto-tuned singing. In 2020, Central Cee moved to a style similar to UK drill with the release of the single "Day in the Life", and has mostly stuck to that style since then, stating that the auto-tune style was oversaturated. His current style of music has been described as a melodic and upbeat approach to UK drill.

Discography

Mixtapes

Extended plays

Singles

As lead artist

As featured artist

Other charted songs

Guest appearances

Tours

Headlining 

 Still Loading World Tour (2022)

Awards and nominations

Notes

References 

English male rappers
Living people
1998 births
Rappers from London
UK drill musicians
People from Shepherd's Bush
English people of Guyanese descent
English people of Irish descent
English people of Ecuadorian descent